Blaine is an unincorporated community in Portage County, Wisconsin, United States.

Geography

Blaine (Portage County) is located in central Wisconsin approximately four miles northeast of Almond, or nine miles south of Amherst (Lat: 44° 18'  31.8", Lon: -89° 18' 54.7").  Blaine is located in the town of Belmont. Blaine intersects Portage County Highways A & D, and the Belmont Township Road "Fourth Avenue," approximately 4 miles south of Wisconsin State Highway 54.

History
Blaine became the site of a rural post office in 1876 and was probably named after James G. Blaine, a leading Republican who was defeated in the 1884 Presidential election. The community included a country store, a Methodist church, a creamery, a blacksmith shop and a grange hall. The post office was discontinued in 1903, but the grange hall remains, serving as the Belmont Town Hall.

Economy
Blaine is home to the Blaine Store, a church and several houses.

Notes

External links
Portage County Historical Society
University of Wisconsin - Stevens Point's Archives of Belmont Township, Wiscinsin

Unincorporated communities in Wisconsin
Unincorporated communities in Portage County, Wisconsin